Madison is a city in Lake County, South Dakota, United States. The population was 6,191 at the 2020 census. It is the county seat of Lake County and is home to Dakota State University.

Geography
Madison is located at  (44.007734, -97.114738).

Madison has been assigned the ZIP code 57042 and the FIPS place code 40220.

Madison is located between Lake Herman and Lake Madison.

Climate

Demographics

2010 census
As of the census of 2010, there were 6,474 people, 2,627 households, and 1,449 families living in the city. The racial makeup of the city was 94.5% White, 0.7% African American, 0.9% Native American, 1.1% Asian, 1.3% from other races, and 1.5% from two or more races. Hispanic or Latino of any race were 2.4% of the population.

There were 2,627 households, of which 26.5% had children under the age of 18 living with them, 42.6% were married couples living together, 9.4% had a female householder with no husband present, 3.2% had a male householder with no wife present, and 44.8% were non-families. 37.3% of all households were made up of individuals, and 14.2% had someone living alone who was 65 years of age or older. The average household size was 2.22 and the average family size was 2.93.

The median age in the city was 34.6 years. 20.6% of residents were under the age of 18; 18.1% were between the ages of 18 and 24; 20.4% were from 25 to 44; 23.6% were from 45 to 64; and 17.3% were 65 years of age or older. The gender makeup of the city was 49.8% male and 50.2% female.

2000 census
As of the census of 2000, there were 6,540 people, 2,589 households, and 1,491 families living in the city. The population density was 1,529.4 people per square mile (590.0/km2). There were 2,706 housing units at an average density of 632.8 per square mile (244.1/km2). The racial makeup of the city was 97.16% White, 0.24% African American, 0.81% Native American, 0.76% Asian, 0.02% Pacific Islander, 0.40% from other races, and 0.61% from two or more races. Hispanic or Latino of any race were 0.92% of the population.

There were 2,589 households, out of which 26.6% had children under the age of 18 living with them, 47.2% were married couples living together, 7.5% had a female householder with no husband present, and 42.4% were non-families. 34.8% of all households were made up of individuals, and 16.7% had someone living alone who was 65 years of age or older. The average household size was 2.26 and the average family size was 2.94.

In the city, the population was spread out, with 21.3% under the age of 18, 21.0% from 18 to 24, 21.7% from 25 to 44, 17.4% from 45 to 64, and 18.6% who were 65 years of age or older. The median age was 33 years. For every 100 females, there were 93.7 males. For every 100 females age 18 and over, there were 93.2 males.

As of 2000 the median income for a household in the city was $30,434, and the median income for a family was $39,745. Males had a median income of $28,408 versus $20,965 for females. The per capita income for the city was $14,767. About 6.3% of families and 11.9% of the population were below the poverty line, including 12.2% of those under age 18 and 7.7% of those age 65 or over.

History

Madison was laid out in 1873. The city was named after Madison, Wisconsin.

On May 12, 2022, Madison, along with several other towns in the region, were affected by a destructive derecho.

Transportation

Madison was once served by passenger trains of the Milwaukee Road. The former depot is now listed on the National Register of Historic Places.

Notable people

Politics and courts:

 Casey Crabtree, member of the South Dakota Senate
 Rick Weiland
 Karl Mundt, four-term U.S. senator 
 Harry A. Keegan, former member of the Wisconsin State Assembly
 Emma Louise Lowe - Musician, educator, former First Lady of American Samoa and former First Lady of Guam
 Richard Barrett Lowe, 29th governor of American Samoa (1953–1956) and 8th governor of Guam (1956–1959)
 Donald James Porter, United States federal judge
 Roberto Lange, United States federal judge
 Lori S. Wilbur, former justice of the South Dakota Supreme Court
 Scott Parsley, member of the South Dakota State Senate
 Marli Wiese, member of the South Dakota House of Representatives
 Royal McCracken, who served in the South Dakota State Senate 

Entertainment:

 Jessica Fjerstad, Miss South Dakota Teen USA 2002 and Miss South Dakota USA 2005
 Mary Hart, host of Entertainment Tonight
 Jerry Schemmel, radio voice of the Denver Nuggets and Colorado Rockies and cyclist
 Hugh Smith (news anchor)

Athletes:

 Charles McCallister, water polo player who competed in the 1932 Summer Olympics and in the 1936 Summer Olympics 
 Gene Vidal, athlete and aviator, father of Gore Vidal
 Clare Jacobs, pole vaulter who medaled in the Olympics.

Academics:

 Maurice Nelles, engineer and professor
 Kay Amert, scholar of French Renaissance printing and professor

Media

Radio

AM radio

FM radio

References

External links

 
 Madison Chamber of Commerce
 Madison Area Arts Council
 MadisonSD.com
 

Cities in South Dakota
Cities in Lake County, South Dakota
County seats in South Dakota
Populated places established in 1880
1880 establishments in Dakota Territory